Designing for the Sexes is a television show on HGTV.  In each episode, a married couple with distinct tastes about decorating consult with an interior designer to create a room that meets both their needs, it aired from 1998 until 2011.

Designing for the Sexes (1998) was hosted by Michael Payne

Designing for the Sexes (2002) was hosted by Susan Hunt

Designing for the Sexes (2008) was hosted by Richard Whiteford II as "Rick Rifle".

135 episodes over 9 seasons were produced by Pie Town Productions for Home and Garden Television.

References 

HGTV original programming